The 1979 Nicholls State Colonels football team represented Nicholls State University as an independent during the 1979 NCAA Division II football season. Led by sixth-year head coach Bill Clements, the Colonels compiled a record of 8–3. Nicholls State played home games at John L. Guidry Stadium in Thibodaux, Louisiana.

Schedule

References

Nicholls State
Nicholls Colonels football seasons
Nicholls State Colonels football